Sinus Iridum  (Latin sinus īridum "Bay of Rainbows") is a plain of basaltic lava that forms a northwestern extension to the Mare Imbrium on Earth's moon. It is surrounded from the northeast to the southwest by the Montes Jura range. The protruding part of the range at the southwest end is named Promontorium Heraclides, while that at the northeast end is called Promontorium Laplace. This bay and the surrounding mountains is considered one of the most beautiful features on the Moon, and is a favorite among lunar observers.

Sinus Iridum is formed from the remains of a large impact crater, which was subsequently flooded with basaltic lava, inundating the "sea" wall. The bay itself does not contain any notable impact craters, but does include the satellite crater Heraclides E in the south, Laplace A along the eastern edge, and Bianchini G in the north. The surface is level, but is marked by a number of wrinkle ridges (dorsa).

The selenographic coordinates of the bay's center are 45.01° N, 31.67° W, and the diameter is 249 km. It was the planned landing site of Chang'e 3, China's 2013 lunar exploration mission, which instead landed nearby in Mare Imbrium.

When 10 to 11 days after new moon the Sinus Iridium is still in shadow, the Montes Jura can already be visible at the lunar terminator. This geometry is also called Golden Handle.

Satellite craters
By convention these features are identified on lunar maps by placing the letter on the side of the crater midpoint that is closest to Promontorium Heraclides.

The following satellite craters are associated with the Promontorium Laplace.

See also
Volcanism on the Moon

References

External links

 , excellent earth-based image of Sinus Iridum and vicinity

 On the Shore of the Bay of Rainbows - Lunar Reconnaissance Orbiter page with images
 High resolution video by Seán Doran of an overflight of Sinus Iridum, based on LRO data; this video also passes over Sinus Iridum about halfway through (see album for more)

Maria on the Moon
Mare Imbrium